The Men's time trial C2 road cycling event at the 2012 Summer Paralympics took place on September 5 at Brands Hatch. Sixteen riders from thirteen different nations competed. The race distance was 16 km.

Results

References

Men's road time trial C2